Grevillea neorigida is a species of flowering plant in the family Proteaceae and is endemic to Western Australia. It is compact, spreading shrub with deeply-divided leaves, the end lobes linear and somewhat sharply-pointed, and clusters of creamy-brown to off-white flowers with a scarlet or orange-red style.

Description

Taxonomy
In 1994 Peter Olde and Neil Marriott described Grevillea rigida in The Grevillea Book from specimens collected east of Ravensthorpe in 1986,  but the name was illegitimate because it had already been used for a fossil species. In 2014, Ian Mark Turner changed the name to Grevillea neorigida in Annales Botanici Fennici.

In the same publication, Olde and Marriott described two subspecies of G. rigida, and Turner has legitimised the names that are accepted by the Australian Plant Census:
The specific epithet (rigida) means "hard" or "stiff" and neorigida refers to this being the new name for G. rigida.

Distribution and habitat
Grevillea neorigida grows in mallee-heath and tall shrubland on granitic loam soils in the Esperance Plains and Mallee bioregions of south-western Western Australia. Subspecies distans occurs from the Fitzgerald River National Park and north almost to Ravensthorpe and west to Jerramungup and subsp. rigida mainly north and north-east of Ravensthrope.

Conservation status
Both subspecies of G. neorigida are listed as "not threatened" by the Government of Western Australia Department of Biodiversity, Conservation and Attractions.

References

neorigida
Proteales of Australia
Endemic flora of Australia
Eudicots of Western Australia
Plants described in 1994